A mercury fountain is a fountain constructed for use with liquid metallic mercury ("quicksilver") rather than water.

Mercury fountains existed in some castles in Islamic Spain; the most famous one was located at the Kasr-al-Kholaifa in Córdoba.

Calder's Mercury Fountain

The most well-known modern example is a sculpture designed by the American artist Alexander Calder, commissioned by the Spanish Republican government for the 1937 World Exhibition in Paris. The artwork is a memorial to the siege of Almadén by General Franco's troops; at the time, the region supplied 60 percent of the world's mercury.

The fountain was a sculptural counterpart to Guernica, Pablo Picasso's protest against Spanish Civil War atrocities. Calder's Mercury Fountain is now at the Fundació Joan Miró in Barcelona, displayed behind glass to control toxic mercury vapors.

References

External links
Calder's Mercury Fountain at the Fundació Joan Miró
Photos of Calder's Mercury Fountain by Mary Ann Sullivan
Video of Calder's Mercury Fountain in installation context
Closeup video of flow in Calder's Mercury Fountain

Fountains
Mercury (element)
Sculptures by Alexander Calder
1937 sculptures

ca:Font de mercuri
es:Fuente de Mercurio